Stephen Kenny (born 30 October 1971) is an Irish football manager and former player who is currently manager of the Republic of Ireland national football team. He has formerly managed Longford Town, Bohemians, Derry City, Dunfermline Athletic, Shamrock Rovers, Dundalk and the Republic of Ireland U21 He is one of Ireland's most successful domestic league managers, having won eight trophies with Dundalk.

Early life
Kenny grew up in Tallaght and lived there for the first 18 years of his life. He attended Our Lady of Loreto Boys National School and Old Bawn Community School. Kenny ran a successful meat-production business in the late 1990s before moving into football management full-time.

Playing career
During his playing career, Kenny spent two years at Belvedere as a schoolboy before signing for St Patrick's Athletic. Without making an appearance he then transferred to Home Farm, playing just four games in the League of Ireland First Division making his League of Ireland debut on 13 March 1994.

Coaching career

St Patrick's Athletic Under-21
Kenny began his coaching career with St Patrick's Athletic when he took charge of the Dublin side's Under 21 side in the Athletic Union League. His first year was successful as St. Pats won the league.

Longford Town
In the summer of 1998, Kenny became the youngest manager in National League history when he took over Longford Town at the age of 26. He led Longford to huge success during his three-year tenure as they won promotion to the League of Ireland Premier Division, and reached the 2001 FAI Cup Final, subsequently, qualifying for the 2001–02 UEFA Cup.

Bohemians
In December 2001, Kenny left the midlands club and became manager of Bohemians. Taking over at Dalymount Park. Bohemians were then the champions of the Eircom League, having won the Double the previous season. However, the club was in something of a crisis, having parted ways with their league-winning manager, Roddy Collins, in the summer, his successor Pete Mahon struggling after an excellent start to the season. Kenny's impact at Bohemians was immediate, as the side steadily moved away from the lower end of the league table and reached that year's FAI Cup final. However, the season was to end in bitter disappointment, as Bohemians were beaten 2–1 by Dundalk FC, a club which had been relegated from the top flight the previous week. This was Kenny's second FAI Cup final defeat in as many seasons. In the close season Kenny made some changes to the first team squad, and the 2002/2003 season saw Bohemians win the Premier Division title, leading from start to finish. The following season they finished runners-up to Shelbourne FC. In the 2004 season Bohemians began poorly and after 3 months found themselves in 3rd place. Kenny's job was insecure and he was sacked on 27 July 2004, following Bohemians' 3–1 home defeat in the UEFA Cup to Estonian side FC Levadia Tallinn. His league record at Bohemians was 49 wins in 96 games.

Derry City (first spell)

After just three weeks out of the game, Kenny returned to management at Derry City following the sacking of Gavin Dykes, and took over from caretaker manager, Peter Hutton. His time at the club has been hugely successful and he has been credited for turning a team, battling against relegation in the 2004 season, into one which challenged for the Premier Division title in 2005, finishing runners-up.

He also guided Derry City to their first advancement in European competition in over 40 years (the last seeing Lyn Oslo being knocked out) Derry qualified for the UEFA Cup by finishing runners-up in the Premier Division in the 2005 season. On 13 July 2006, Derry overcame two-time winners IFK Göteborg in the UEFA Cup first qualifying round 2–0 on aggregate. A 79th-minute header from Sean Hargan was enough to give Derry a shock win in the first leg, and Stephen O'Flynn ensured a 1–0 home victory from the penalty spot. Manager Stephen Kenny was delighted with the win stating:
 This marked Derry City's first progression in European football since defeating Lyn Oslo more than 40 years ago.

Derry City were subsequently drawn against Scottish second-level side Gretna in the second qualifying round. On 10 August 2006, Derry claimed a 5–1 away win to gain a considerable advantage going into the home leg. This result is the largest away winning margin for a League of Ireland team in Europe. Following a 2–2 home draw with Gretna F.C. in the second leg and a 7–3 win on aggregate, Derry advanced to the UEFA Cup First round. In the draw, held on 25 August 2006, Derry City were handed a tough tie against Paris Saint-Germain FC. The first leg was played at home at Brandywell Stadium on the evening of 14 September 2006 and ended in a hard-fought 0–0 draw, a magnificent result for the battling Derry side. The second leg was played at Parc des Princes on 28 September. Paris St. Germain won the second leg 2–0 with goals from Pauleta and Edouard Cisse.

He remained in charge of Derry City until 17 November 2006 for their final league game before moving to Dunfermline Athletic. Derry finished second in the league behind Shelbourne, who had a stronger goal difference. Kenny then made a remarkable return to Derry City to manage the club for the FAI Cup final win against St. Patrick's Athletic.

Kenny's total managerial record at Derry included 112 games managed, 65 games won, 29 games drawn, 18 games lost, 170 goals for, 80 goals against and 57 clean sheets. His win percentage was 58%. During his time in charge, a total of 32 players represented the club, and 7 players that he managed went on to represent their country at international level.

Dunfermline Athletic
Kenny was confirmed as the new Dunfermline Athletic manager on 10 November 2006 and took up his position on 18 November 2006 where he was to watch Dunfermline's game against Dundee United from the stand
An interview was done upon his arrival at the club by stv.

Following his departure from the League of Ireland, his contributions during the 2006 season were still recognised by eircom / Soccer Writers Association of Ireland (SWAI) who nominated the former Derry manager for their 'Personality of the Year' award on 13 December 2006.

Kenny won his first game as Dunfermline manager 9 games into his Pars career – a 3–2 Scottish Cup 3rd round win over Rangers at East End Park. In January 2007, Kenny brought in Jim O'Brien, Adam Hammill, Bobby Ryan, Jamie Harris and Stephen Glass to the club and later brought in released Falkirk striker Tam McManus.

Kenny and his coaching team led Dunfermline to the Scottish Cup Final on 24 April 2007 with a 1–0 win over Hibernian in the Semi final replay then losing to Celtic in the final
1–0. He was unable, however, to prevent the club being relegated from the Premier League. A 2–1 defeat at Inverness CT, coupled with St Mirren's 3–2 win at Motherwell saw the Fife club relegated to the First Division, despite having previously won four league games in a row.

After relegation to the Scottish Football League Kenny's reign was less successful. Losses to BK Häcken of Sweden in the UEFA Cup, Heart of Midlothian in the Scottish League Cup and several humiliating defeats in the league left Dunfermline significantly behind the leading teams in the First Division and cost him his job, in spite of a run to the lower-league Scottish Challenge Cup Final.

After one year in charge, on 4 December 2007, Kenny was sacked as Dunfermline manager. Striker Jim McIntyre – injured for much of Kenny's reign – took charge as caretaker of the club.

Derry City (second spell)
Following his departure from Dunfermline Athletic and the sacking of Derry City manager John Robertson, Kenny was strongly linked with a return to the League of Ireland club. In his first spell, Kenny guided Derry to the FAI Cup, two League Cups and through two UEFA Cup rounds, including defeating former UEFA cup winners IFK Göteborg home and away, and thrashing then Scottish giant killers Gretna only to be knocked out of the competition by an away defeat by Paris Saint-Germain. They were also pipped for the league crown on the final day of the season on two occasions. Kenny was confirmed to have returned to Derry City on 28 December 2007. After being removed from the Premier Division for entering administration Kenny stayed on as Derry Manager and guided them back to the top after winning the First Division in one season.

Shamrock Rovers
On Christmas Eve 2011, Kenny resigned from Derry City after Shamrock Rovers moved to fill the vacant managers job at the club, replacing Michael O'Neill. This was confirmed on 27 December. Kenny took over a club that had won the League of Ireland two years in a row under O'Neill. However the 2012 season proved to be a disaster for Kenny and Rovers, slumping to fourth place in the league table. On 11 September 2012, two months before the end of the season and after a Dublin derby defeat to Bohemians, Shamrock Rovers sacked Kenny.

Dundalk
In November 2012, the new owners of Dundalk turned to Kenny—out of work since being sacked by Shamrock Rovers—to become their new manager. They mounted an unexpected title challenge in his first season, eventually finishing as runners-up—a defeat to eventual champions St. Patrick's Athletic ultimately costing them the title. But Kenny kept the nucleus of the new side together for the following season, and went on to guide the club to its first league title since 1994–95. They also won that season's League Cup, the club's first League and League Cup Double. The 2015 season saw them dominate, winning the club's third League and FAI Cup Double—with the title being won by 11-points and the Cup with victory over Cork City in the final. They also won the Leinster Senior Cup—the club's first 'treble' since 1966–67. A third league title in a row was sealed with two games to spare in 2016.

2016 also saw the club qualify for the Champions League play-off round, after they first defeated FH of Iceland, then came from a goal down in the tie to defeat BATE Borisov 3–1 on aggregate. They drew Legia Warsaw for the play-off, with the first leg played in the Aviva Stadium in Dublin in front of a crowd of 30,417. They suffered a 2–0 defeat in the home leg, but shocked Legia in the return leg by taking a 1–0 lead. With Dundalk pushing for the equaliser that would have taken the tie to extra-time, Legia scored on the break, and won the tie 3–1 on aggregate. As a result, they qualified for the group stage of the Europa League, only the second Irish team to have done so. A draw with AZ Alkmaar in the Netherlands, followed by a victory over Maccabi Tel Aviv in Tallaght Stadium, were the first points earned by an Irish club in the group stage of European competition.

In 2017, after the European run, they won the League Cup again. But the departure of some key players, and a slow start, meant they slipped to runners-up spots in both league and FAI Cup. The club's European form had attracted interest from abroad, however, and a consortium of American investors, backed by sports-investors PEAK6, completed a takeover in January 2018. Kenny's side reasserted itself in 2018, winning another League and Cup Double—the second under Kenny and fourth in the club's history—breaking points-total and goals scored-total records in the process. In the aftermath, Kenny resigned in order to accept the Republic of Ireland U-21 manager's role.

Republic of Ireland
On 25 November 2018, Kenny was appointed as Republic of Ireland U21 manager following the departure of Noel King.	
On the same day, Mick McCarthy was appointed Republic of Ireland senior team manager with Kenny set to replace him in 2020. This transition was originally scheduled to happen during the summer of 2020, but instead happened in April 2020 after the COVID-19 pandemic led to the postponement of UEFA Euro 2020.
His first game in charge was a 1–1 draw with Bulgaria in the UEFA Nations League on 3 September 2020.
On 8 October 2020, Ireland lost to Slovakia 4–2 on penalties in the UEFA Euro 2020 play-off semi-final in Bratislava.
The Republic of Ireland completed 2020 with a record of 4 draws and 4 defeats with one goal scored against Bulgaria on 3 September.

In March 2021, Ireland played two 2022 FIFA World Cup qualifiers losing 3–2 away to Serbia before losing at home 1–0 to Luxembourg. 

On 3 June 2021, Kenny got his first win as Ireland defeated Andorra 4–1 in a friendly at Estadi Nacional.
On 1 September 2021, Ireland were leading Portugal 1–0 in their third 2022 FIFA World Cup qualifier in Estádio Algarve with two minutes to play in normal time, but ended up losing 2–1 with Cristiano Ronaldo scoring two late goals that made him the highest scoring player in men's international football history.
On 9 October 2021, Ireland won their first competitive match under Kenny, a 3–0 away win against Azerbaijan in the 2022 FIFA World Cup qualifiers.
Three days later on 12 October, Ireland won back to back games for the first time under Kenny after defeating Qatar 4–0 in a friendly.
On 14 November 2021, Ireland completed their qualification campaign for the 2022 FIFA World Cup with a 3–0 win away against Luxembourg.

On 9 March 2022, Kenny signed a new contract with Ireland to remain in charge until after Euro 2024.
In June 2022, Ireland played four 2022-23 UEFA Nations League fixtures, a 1-0 loss away to Armenia and a 1-0 loss at home to Ukraine, before defeating Scotland 3-0.
The win over Scotland was a first competitive home win in three years and also a first competitive win at home to a side ranked above them since the win against Bosnia in the UEFA Euro 2016 qualifying play-offs in November 2015. The last of the four games was a 1-1 draw against Ukraine in Łódź.

Personal Life
His son Eoin Kenny is a professional footballer, having signed his first professional contract on 5 March 2023, with his fathers' former club Dundalk.

Managerial statistics

Note: Club games included are competitive games only.

Honours

Manager

Bohemians
League of Ireland Premier Division:
Winner: 2002–03

Derry City
League of Ireland Premier Division:
Runner Up: 2005, 2006
League of Ireland First Division:
Winner: 2010
FAI Cup:
Winner: 2006
Runner Up: 2008

League of Ireland Cup:
Winner: 2005, 2006, 2008, 2011

Dunfermline Athletic
Scottish Cup:
Runner Up: 2007
Scottish Challenge Cup:
Runner Up: 2008

Shamrock Rovers
Leinster Senior Cup: 
Winner: 2012

Dundalk
League of Ireland Premier Division:
Winners: 2014, 2015, 2016, 2018
Runner Up: 2013, 2017
FAI Cup:
Winner: 2015, 2018
Runner Up: 2016, 2017
League of Ireland Cup:
Winner: 2014, 2017
President of Ireland's Cup:
Winner: 2015
Runner up: 2016, 2017, 2018
Leinster Senior Cup:
Winner: 2014–15

Individual
PFAI Manager of the Year: 2013, 2014, 2015, 2018
Irish Tatler Man of the Year: 2016
Philips Sports Manager of the Year: 2016
RTÉ Sports Manager of the Year Award: 2016

References

External links

League of Ireland managers
Republic of Ireland association footballers
Home Farm F.C. players
St Patrick's Athletic F.C. players
League of Ireland players
Republic of Ireland football managers
Dunfermline Athletic F.C. managers
1971 births
Living people
Derry City F.C. managers
Bohemian F.C. managers
Longford Town F.C. managers
Scottish Premier League managers
Shamrock Rovers F.C. managers
Scottish Football League managers
Dundalk F.C. managers
Belvedere F.C. players
Association footballers not categorized by position
Republic of Ireland national football team managers